Australia competed at the 2015 World Aquatics Championships in Kazan, Russia from 24 July to 9 August 2015.

Medalists

Diving

Australia sent a team of eight divers to compete for the individual and synchronized events at the World Championships.

Men

Women

Mixed

Open water swimming

Australia fielded a full team of eight swimmers to compete in the open water marathon.

Men

Women

Mixed

Swimming

Australian swimmers earned qualifying standards in the following events (up to a maximum of 2 swimmers in each event at the A-standard entry time, and 1 at the B-standard): Swimmers must qualify at the 2015 Australian Championships (for pool events) to confirm their places for the Worlds.

Thirty-six swimmers (22 men and 24 women) have been selected to compete for the Australian team, including defending World champions Christian Sprenger in the 100 m breaststroke and Cate Campbell in the 100 m freestyle. 2012 Olympic silver medalist and two-time reigning World champion James Magnussen was set to compete, but later withdrew from the team because of a shoulder injury, having been ruled out to defend his Worlds title in the 100 m freestyle.

Men

Women

Synchronized swimming

Australia has qualified a squad of eleven synchronized swimmers for the following events.

Water polo

Men's tournament

Team roster

James Stanton-French
Richard Campbell
George Ford
John Cotterill
Nathan Power
Jarrod Gilchrist
Aiden Roach
Aaron Younger
Joel Swift
Mitchell Emery
Rhys Howden
Tyler Martin
Joel Dennerley

Group play

Playoffs

Quarterfinals

5th–8th place semifinals

Seventh place game

Women's tournament

Team roster

Lea Yanitsas
Gemma Beadsworth
Hannah Buckling
Holly Lincoln-Smith
Keesja Gofers
Bronwen Knox
Rowie Webster
Glennie McGhie
Zoe Arancini
Ash Southern
Bronte Halligan
Nicola Zagame
Kelsey Wakefield

Group play

Quarterfinals

Semifinals

Third place game

References

External links
Swimming Australia

Nations at the 2015 World Aquatics Championships
2015 in Australian sport
Australia at the World Aquatics Championships